White people is a racial classification specifier, depending on context used for people of Caucasian ancestry.

White People may also refer to:

White People (album), a 2004 album by Handsome Boy Modeling School
White People (book), a 1991 short story collection by Allan Gurganus
White People (film), a 2015 American documentary film
"The White People", a fantasy-horror short story by the Welsh writer Arthur Machen

See also
 White woman (disambiguation)
 White man (disambiguation)